Folk science describes ways of understanding and predicting the natural and social world, without the use of rigorous methodologies (see Scientific method). One could label all understanding of nature predating the Greeks as "folk science".

Folk science is often accepted as "common wisdom" in a given culture, and gets passed on as memes. According to some evolutionary psychologists, it may also reflect the output of evolved cognitive processes of the human mind which have been adapted in the course of human evolution.

Skeptics often investigate the influence and validity of folk science.

Some examples of folk science
 Folk biology
 Folk history
 Folk linguistics
 Folk psychology
 Folk taxonomy
 Informal mathematics
 Naïve physics
 Physiognomy
 Weather lore

See also
 Ethnobiology
 Pseudoscience

References

Philosophy of science
Scientific folklore